Sigron, or Sigrion (Σἱγριον), was a port town of ancient Lesbos.

The site of Sigron is tentatively located near modern Sigri.

References

Populated places in the ancient Aegean islands
Former populated places in Greece
Ancient Lesbos